The Men's 30 kilometre pursuit event of the FIS Nordic World Ski Championships 2017 was held on 25 February 2017.

Results
The race was started at 14:30.

References

Men's 30 kilometre pursuit